Jean-Baptiste Nouganga is a member of the Pan-African Parliament from the Central African Republic.

References

Year of birth missing (living people)
Living people
Members of the Pan-African Parliament from the Central African Republic
Place of birth missing (living people)